The Women's individual pursuit at the 2014 UCI Track Cycling World Championships was held on 28 February 2014. 15 cyclists participated in the contest. After all riders have contested qualifying, the fastest two riders advanced to the final and raced for the gold medal, while the riders ranked third and fourth, raced for the bronze medal.

Medalists

Results

Qualifying
The qualifying was started at 13:30.

Finals
The finals were started at 19:45.

References

2014 UCI Track Cycling World Championships
UCI Track Cycling World Championships – Women's individual pursuit